How 2 is an informative educational programme produced by TVS between 1990 and 1991, and STV Studios (Scottish Television) from 1992 to 2006.

The original show (How) was produced by Southern Television from 1966 up until 1981 when the company lost its franchise to TVS, which was a regular fixture in the ITV schedules.

History
The show began in 1966 as How; a series popular in the 1970s. It was designed to provide answers to questions beginning with the word "How". Each episode began with the presenters all raising one hand and saying "How" simultaneously (playing on the stereotypical Native American greeting). Common topics covered included science, history, mathematics, and simple puzzles. The series came to an end in 1981 when Southern Television lost its ITV franchise, but was revived as How 2 in 1990 by TVS. In 2006 the final series was broadcast, having waited more than a year for transmission. Afterwards, series 14 and 15 were regularly repeated on the CITV channel, normally at weekends and some school holidays until the end of 2012.

A similar CITV show to appear a few years later was The Big Bang, presented by How 2'''s own Gareth Jones and Violet Berlin. The Big Bang had a more scientific slant, focusing on performing fun experiments involving simple physics and chemistry. Other similar British television series included Don't Ask Me. Fred Dinenage was the only presenter to appear in both incarnations of How, presenting the shows for a total of 31 years. On 6 January 2013, as part of CITV's Old Skool Weekend (a televised event celebrating the strand's 30th anniversary), the first episode of the 1995 series was shown. Prior to this, a How 2 segment was featured on the 30 Years of CITV documentary that aired on ITV on 29 December 2012 and featured interviews with Dinenage and Jones.

In 2019 How 2 was made available on Amazon Prime Video in the UK.

Also in 2019, the CITV channel commissioned a further revival of the format. Due for air November 2020, with Fred Dinenage making his third return to the series, alongside a new team of Vick Hope, Sam Homewood and Frankie Vu.

Series overview

Notes
1 The last episode of the series was a 30th anniversary special.
2 Before that, there was "The Best of How 2" which aired on 18 August 1997.
3 The last episode of the series was a Christmas special.

How Goes 2
There was no regular series in 1998 but there was a spin-off series called How Goes 2'', which aired from 25 February to 15 April 1998. The series focused on Fred and Gareth going to different places each week, and the 8 shows featured segments from the first 6-year run, featuring the original 3 presenters.

References

External links
How 2 at itv.com/citv – now defunct.

1990 British television series debuts
2006 British television series endings
1990s British children's television series
2000s British children's television series
English-language television shows
ITV children's television shows
Television series by STV Studios
Television shows produced by Scottish Television
Television shows produced by Television South (TVS)